KJLO (104.1 FM) is an American radio station licensed in Monroe, Louisiana, United States. The station is currently owned by The Radio People and the broadcast license is held by Holladay Broadcasting Of Louisiana, LLC.  Studios are located in Monroe, and its transmitter is located near Sterlington, Louisiana.

Coverage
K-104 is a 100,000 watt radio station (97,000 watts effective radiated Power) providing local country music, news, and weather coverage to the Louisiana area including Monroe, West Monroe, Bastrop, Jonesboro, Ruston, and Winnsboro. Local Arkansas coverage includes Crossett. The intermediate (distant) coverage in the Louisiana area includes Lake Providence and Winnfield with intermediate Arkansas coverage including El Dorado. Distant or fringe coverage extends out to cover the Louisiana areas including Minden. Arkansas coverage extends to Camden, Magnolia, Monticello, and also extends into Greenville and Vicksburg, Mississippi.

Warhawk Sports Radio Network
KJLO broadcasts every Louisiana–Monroe Warhawks football game .

References

External links

Radio stations in Louisiana
Mass media in Monroe, Louisiana
Country radio stations in the United States
The Radio People radio stations